Kufstein railway station serves the city of Kufstein, in the Kufstein district of the Austrian federal state of Tyrol.  Opened in 1876, it is an Austrian-German border station, close to the border between Tyrol and Bavaria.

The station forms part of the Lower Inn Valley railway, and is also a terminus of the Rosenheim–Kufstein railway.  It is owned and operated by the Austrian Federal Railways (ÖBB).

Location
Kufstein railway station is situated in Südtiroler Platz, right in the heart of the city, on the west bank of the Inn river.

History

In 1858, a railway was opened between Rosenheim and Innsbruck via Kufstein.  However, it was not until 1876 that a station was built in Kufstein.  In 1980, the city's original station building was completely replaced by what was, for that time, quite a modern structure.

At the start of the 1980s, the other facilities at the station were similarly comprehensively rebuilt.  As part of the renovations, the pedestrian bridge in Kufstein's locality of Zell was moved a few hundred metres (yards) to the south.

A new park-and-ride facility has been built on the west side of the station, and the platforms were equipped with lifts.

Up until now, the station has never been a hub, although several projects are well advanced.  Even so, it can be designated indirectly as a node, because Austrian domestic trains operate from Kufstein along the line to Rosenheim until just before Rosenheim, where they turn onto the Rosenheimer Schleife, and then continue on to Salzburg, without stopping in Germany.

Train services
Almost all trains passing through Kufstein stop there, including multiple daily Intercity-Express (ICE) connections (to Vienna, Bregenz, Innsbruck, and Berlin).

Regional trains operate between Rosenheim und Innsbruck and other stops in the Upper Inn valley, and between Wörgl Hauptbahnhof and Kufstein, Kufstein, and Rosenheim, and between Kufstein and Munich.  Line S1 of the Tyrol S-Bahn links Kufstein at hourly intervals with Landeck.

EuroCity and InterCity trains operate at least hourly to Innsbruck and then to further destinations alternating between Bregenz, Switzerland and Italy and also at least every second hour to Munich and Vienna.

There are also other further trains, such as an express train to Zell am See, and various special trains and CityNightLine connections to Belgium, Denmark, northern Germany and the Netherlands.

Interchange
The station is a terminus for many regional and city buses.  Taxis are available at a large taxi stand in front of the station building.

The future
In cooperation with the city of Kufstein and the Stadtwerke Kufstein, the ÖBB is planning a redesigned station forecourt (Südtirolerplatz) - a concept still in development.

The new Unterinntaltrasse (English:Lower Inn Valley route) is under construction between Kundl and Hall in Tirol. In a few years, other sections of the route will be constructed between Wörgl and Kufstein, and between Kufstein and Brannenburg. However, a construction start on these sections before 2020 is no longer a possibility. The route selection process for Kundl to Langkampfen section is underway, but future plans depend heavily on the interests of Germany, as the tunnel will run under the border.

Meanwhile, the ÖBB has submitted to the city of Kufstein a project for land use changes on the site of the former customs clearance facilities.  The ÖBB hopes to obtain permission to build a multi-storey office and commercial building on that site.

See also

History of rail transport in Austria
Rail transport in Austria

References

External links 

 

This article is based upon a translation of the German language version as at February 2011.

Railway Station
Railway stations in Tyrol (state)
Railway stations opened in 1876